Hyalinobatrachium pellucidum, also known as the Rio Azuela glass frog, is a species of frog in the family Centrolenidae. It is found in lower montane rainforests on the Amazonian Andean slopes in Ecuador and Peru. The specific name pellucidum is Latin for "transparent" and refers to the transparent parietal peritoneum of this species.

Description
The snout is truncated. The tympanum is partially hidden under skin. Dorsal skin is slightly granular. The dorsum is pale green with diffuse yellow dots. The fingers and toes are yellow and partly webbed. Lower surfaces are unpigmented and the heart is visible through the parietal peritoneum. The iris is pale silver bronze.

The male advertisement call is a single, monotone note, without amplitude modulation.

Habitat and conservation
Individuals have been found at night on the upper surfaces of leaves of trees and herbs, about 1.5 to 4 metres above streams. Egg clutches are laid in vegetation where they may fall victim to predation from spiders.

The species is threatened by habitat loss caused by smallholder farming and logging. Ex-situ conservation programs have begun to help save this interesting creature.

References

pellucidum
Amphibians of the Andes
Amphibians of Ecuador
Amphibians of Peru
Amphibians described in 1973
Taxa named by William Edward Duellman
Taxa named by John Douglas Lynch
Taxonomy articles created by Polbot